Saint Lazarus cemetery is a large cemetery in Chișinău in Moldova. It is 2,000,000 square metres in area, and has 250,000 graves.

References

External links
 

Cemeteries in Moldova
Buildings and structures in Chișinău